Vetle Eck Aga (born 4 October 1993) is a Norwegian handball player for Kolstad Håndball and the Norwegian national team.

He represented Norway at the 2022 European Men's Handball Championship.

References

1993 births
Living people
Norwegian male handball players
Sportspeople from Bodø
Norwegian expatriate sportspeople in Sweden
IK Sävehof players
Kolstad Håndball players